Aga Khan (also transliterated as Aqa Khan and Agha Khan) is a title held by the Imām of the Nizari Ismāʿīli Shias. Since 1957, the holder of the title has been the 49th Imām, Prince Shah Karim al-Husseini, Aga Khan IV (b. 1936). Aga Khans claim descent from Muhammad, the last prophet according to the doctrine of Islam.

Title
The title is made up of the titles "agha" and "khan". The Turkish "agha" is "aqa" (Āqā) in Persian. The word "agha" comes from the Old Turkic and Mongolian "aqa", meaning "elder men", and means something like "master" or "lord." "Khan" means king or ruler in Turkish and Mongolian languages.

According to Farhad Daftary, a scholar of the Isma'ili movement, Aga Khan is an honorific title bestowed on Hasan Ali Shah (1800–1881), the 46th Imām of Nizari Ismai'lis (1817–1881), by Persian king Fath-Ali Shah Qajar. However, Daftary apparently contradicts what the Aga Khan III noted in a famous legal proceeding in India: that Aga Khan is not a title but instead an alias that was given to the Aga Khan I when he was a young man.

History
During the latter stages of the First Anglo-Afghan War (1841–1842), Hasan Ali Shah and his cavalry officers provided assistance to General Nott in Kandahar Province and to General England in his advance from Sindh to join Nott. For these and for other diligent efforts made by him in the service of the Empire, the British Raj recognised him as a "Prince". This title was less extraordinary in that time and place than it seems today, because the British while consolidating their hold on India, had been handing out similar titles liberally to any large landowner or tribal chieftain with local influence who made himself useful to them.

The Aga Khan was exceptional in that, while it was the local tribal influence that had enabled him to serve the British and gain their favour, his claim to nobility was based upon his claim to leadership of an entire sect of Islam. Imperial Britain saw great possibilities in having under their control and patronage the head of a major Shia sect; it could even be used at some later stage to counterbalance the influence of the Ottoman Caliph, the head of Islam as recognized by the Sunni sects. The Aga Khan was the only religious or community leader in British India granted a personal gun salute.

When Hasan Ali Shah, the first Aga Khan, came to Sindh (which is now in Pakistan) from Afghanistan, he and his army were welcomed by Mir Nasir Khan Noori of Baluchistan. In 1866, the Aga Khan won a court victory in the High Court of Bombay in what popularly became known as the Aga Khan Case, securing his recognition by the British government as the head of the Khoja community. The Aga Khan is also the Pir within the Nizari Ismaili community.

The Bombay High Court decision of 1866 recognized Aga Khan I as the hereditary Imām of Isma'ilis. 

In 1887, the Secretary of State for India, acting through the Viceroy of India, formally recognized the title Aga Khan.

List of Aga Khans
Four Ismāʿīli imāms have held this title:
Aga Khan I – Hasan Ali Shah Mahallati (1804–1881), 46th Imam of Nizari Ismailis (1817–1881)
Aga Khan II – Shah Ali Shah  (about 1830–1885), 47th Imam of Nizari Ismailis (12 April 1881 – August 1885)
Aga Khan III – Sir Sultan Mohammed Shah (1877–1957), 48th Imam of Nizari Ismailis (17 August 1885 – 11 July 1957)
Aga Khan IV – Prince Shah Karim Al Husseini (b. 1936), 49th Imam of Nizari Ismailis (11 July 1957 – present)

See also
List of Ismaili imams
Imamate in Nizari doctrine
Imamate in Shia doctrine

References

Further reading
"Les Agas Khans", Yann Kerlau, Perrin 2004

 
Titles
Religious leadership roles
1818 introductions